The Financial Secretary of Ceylon was an officer of the Ceylonese Government and member of the Board of Ministers. The Treasurer of Ceylon was one of six offices that held a seat in the Executive Council of Ceylon from 1809 to 1932. The post was replaced by the that of Financial Secretary in 1932, as one of three officers of state of the new Board of Ministers that replaced the Executive Council under recommendations of the Donoughmore Commission. The Financial Secretary was in turn replaced by the new office of the Minister of Finance in 1947 under the recommendations of the Soulbury Commission under the Ceylon Independence Act, 1947 and The Ceylon (Constitution and Independence) Orders in Council 1947.

Departments
 General Treasury 
 Loan Board
 Government Stores Department 
 Government Printing Office
 Government Assessor
 Income Tax Department 
 Customs

List of Financial Secretaries
Data based on:
 John Ferguson, Ceylon in the "jubilee Year"., J. Haddon and Co.,1887
 Ceylon: Its History, People, Commerce, Industries and Resources, Plâté limited, 1924

See also
 Governors of British Ceylon
 Chief Secretary of Ceylon
 Legal Secretary of Ceylon
 General Officer Commanding, Ceylon
 Attorney General of Sri Lanka
 Auditor General of Sri Lanka

References

Defunct government positions in Sri Lanka